SRC Kraljevica is an indoor sporting arena located in Zaječar, Serbia. The capacity of the arena is 2,360 people. It is currently home to the RK Zaječar handball team.

See also
List of indoor arenas in Serbia
Zaječar

References

External links

Indoor arenas in Serbia
Basketball venues in Serbia
Sport in Zaječar